Melissa Galloway (born 3 April 1993) is a New Zealand dressage rider. She represented New Zealand at the 2022 FEI World Championships in the Herning, finishing 33rd. Galloway is the highest ranked dressage rider from New Zealand and won several golden medals at the national championships. In 2022 she moved to The Netherlands to train with Danish Olympian Anne van Olst.

References

Living people
1993 births
New Zealand female equestrians
New Zealand dressage riders
People from the Marlborough Region
Sportspeople from Auckland